Golden Circle Air, Inc. was an American aircraft manufacturer based in De Soto, Iowa. The company specialized in the manufacture of ultralight aircraft in the form of kits for amateur construction and ready-to-fly aircraft under the US FAR 103 Ultralight Vehicles rules.

The company put the Teratorn Tierra series of aircraft designs back into production as the Golden Circle Air T-Bird, after Teratorn Aircraft of Clear Lake, Iowa went out of business in 1989. Golden Circle further developed the design from the original single seat Tierra and the two seats in side-by-side configuration Tierra II into the three seat T-Bird III and the T-Bird Tandem TBT06 tandem-seat ultralight.

After Golden Circle Air went out of business in circa 2006 the T-Bird aircraft designs were acquired by Indy Aircraft of Independence, Iowa and put back into production in 2011.

Aircraft

References

External links
Company website archives on Archive.org

Defunct aircraft manufacturers of the United States
Ultralight aircraft
Homebuilt aircraft